The retroflex ejective affricate is a type of consonantal sound, used in some spoken languages.

Features
Features of the retroflex ejective affricate:

Occurrence

See also
 List of phonetic topics

External links
 

Affricates
Ejectives
Retroflex consonants
Oral consonants
Central consonants